The Hen with Sapphire Pendant egg or Egg with Hen in Basket is an Imperial Fabergé egg, one in a series of fifty-two jeweled eggs made under the supervision of Peter Carl Fabergé for the Russian Imperial family. It was created in 1886 for Alexander III of Russia, who presented it to his wife, the Empress Maria Feodorovna. It is one of six imperial eggs that are currently lost.

Design
The exact design of this egg is not known as there are no known photographs or illustrations of the egg and written descriptions of the egg sometimes conflict with one another. 
The present is described as "a hen of gold and rose diamonds taking a sapphire egg out of a nest" in the imperial archive dated February 15, 1886 through April 24, 1886. 
The sapphire egg was loosely held in the hen's beak. The hen and the basket were both made of gold studded with hundreds of rose-cut diamonds. 
The archive of the Russian Provisional Government describes the hen as being silver on a stand of gold, though this description is probably in error since the orders for the 1886 Tsar egg specifically stated the present was to be made of gold.

Surprise
The surprise was not documented and is unlikely to be discovered as the egg's current whereabouts are unknown.

History
The Sapphire Pendant Egg was sent to Tsar Alexander III on April 5, 1886 from Fabergé's workshop. The egg was presented by the Tsar to Tsarina Marie Fedorovna on April 13 of the same year. The egg was housed in the Anichkov Palace until the Revolution. The last documented location of the egg is from the archive of the provisional government's inventory in 1922 when the egg was held in the Armory Palace of the Kremlin. It is not known whether the egg was lost or is currently in private hands.

See also
Egg decorating

References

Sources

1886 works
Lost Fabergé eggs
Imperial Fabergé eggs
Alexander III of Russia